Alfred William Fincher (born August 15, 1983) is a former American football linebacker. He was drafted by the New Orleans Saints in the third round of the 2005 NFL Draft. He played college football at Connecticut.

Fincher has also been a member of the Detroit Lions, Washington Redskins, and New York Sentinels.

Fincher works as a fisherman in the Bahamas with ex-Connecticut teammate and NFL prospect Deon McPhee.

Professional career

New Orleans Saints
In 2006, Fincher played in six games for the New Orleans Saints and recorded nine tackles.

Fincher played in seven games for the New Orleans Saints in 2007, recording three tackles.  He was placed on injured reserve on November 4, 2007 due to a concussion, ending his season.  He was waived from injured reserve on November 29. He has inspired his cousin Travis Fincher while playing for the 'SR Colts', during the 2007-08 season.

Detroit Lions
On March 27, 2008, Fincher was signed by the Detroit Lions.  However, he was released on July 27 after linebacker Teddy Lehman was re-signed.

Washington Redskins
On July 31, 2008, Fincher was signed by the Washington Redskins. He re-signed with the Redskins on March 10, 2009. He was waived on August 30.

External links
United Football League bio

1983 births
Living people
People from Norwood, Massachusetts
Players of American football from Massachusetts
American football linebackers
UConn Huskies football players
New Orleans Saints players
Detroit Lions players
Washington Redskins players
New York Sentinels players